PMO may refer to:

Government and military
 Grade A Pasteurized Milk Ordinance, a United States Food and Drug Administration standard
 Polish Military Organisation, an intelligence and sabotage group during World War I
 Prime Minister's Office (disambiguation), government departments in several countries
 Principal Medical Officer
 Priority Material Office, a logistics support command of the United States Navy

Science
 Periodic mesoporous organosilica, a class of materials
 Phosphorodiamidate morpholino oligo, a type of molecule in molecular biology
 Planetary mass object, a celestial object of size similar to a planet

Other uses
 Falcone–Borsellino Airport, Italy (IATA Airport Code)
 Pine Mountain Observatory, an astronomical observatory in Oregon, United States
 Project management office, a standards group within an organisation